The SS Marama was an ocean liner belonging to the Union Company of New Zealand from 1907 to 1937. It was a hospital ship in WWI as His Majesty's New Zealand Hospital Ship No. 2.

History 
Built by Caird & Company at Greenock at a cost of £166,000 ($332,000), the SS Marama arrived at Port Chalmers in November 1907. It was the largest and most powerful ship (though not the fastest) in the USS Co fleet. Initially, it sailed on the Horseshoe run to Australia, and occasionally in trans-Pacific services. After war service, it was refitted (1920) for the trans-Pacific services to San Francisco or Vancouver. In 1925, it was converted to burn oil, and employed on the Tasman run.

The ship was sold to Shanghai shipbreakers the Linghua Dock & Engineering Works Ltd in 1937, then resold to Kobe shipbreakers Miyachi K.K.K. (who had also purchased the Maheno) and was broken up at their Osaka shipyard in 1938.

Marama Hall at the University of Otago is named after the liner, commemorating medical personnel who served aboard the two New Zealand hospital ships in World War I.

See also 
SS Maheno: sister ship; His Majesty's New Zealand Hospital Ship No. 1.

References

External links
 

1907 ships
Auxiliary ships of the Royal New Zealand Navy
Ships built on the River Clyde
Hospital ships in World War I
Passenger ships of New Zealand
Ships of the Union Steam Ship Company
World War I auxiliary ships of New Zealand
Hospital ships of New Zealand